Stephan Pyles is a chef, cookbook author, philanthropist, and educator.  His dishes blend elements of Southern homestyle cooking, Southwestern fare, Mexican food and Tex-Mex food, as well as Cajun cuisine and Creole cookery.  Pyles, along with his colleagues, Dean Fearing, Robert Del Grande, and Anne Lindsay Greer contributed to changes in the cuisine of the U.S. states of Texas, New Mexico, and Arizona. Pyles spent more than 25 years in the Dallas restaurant circuit, and was further the main creator of New Texas Cuisine. His first two restaurants were the business casual Routh Street Cafe which was founded in 1983 as well as a miniature version of said restaurant called Baby Routh. These restaurants are known for being the flagship of the Southwestern Cuisine explosion of the 1980s and 1990s. Since opening Routh Street Cafe, Pyles has opened some 15 restaurants, including Samar in the fall of 2009.

Pyles, a fifth-generation Texa.  He was awarded, 'Outstanding Restaurateur of the Year' by both the Minnesota Restaurant Association and Texas Restaurant Association.

Stephan Pyles is the author of five cookbooks on Texan and Southwestern Cuisine. In addition to his many achievements, he also hosted the Emmy Award winning PBS television series "New Tastes From Texas With Chef Stephan Pyles." This series ran during 1998 and 1999 and included a number of guest Celebrity chefs, including Diana Kennedy, Rick Bayless, Patricia Quintana, Zarela Martinez, Americo Circuit and David Garrido .

Early life
Stephan Pyles was born in Big Spring, Texas, in 1952. He received classical training in voice and piano, but preferred to apprentice in the kitchen of his family's West Texas truck stop. This was followed by training in fine French Cuisine. Pyles published a cookbook entitled "The New Texas Cuisine", which made him nationally recognized by his early thirties.

Career
Pyles owned and operated the Dallas restaurants Routh Street Cafe and Baby Routh from 1983 to 1993. He owned and operated the restaurants Goodfellow's and Tejas in Minneapolis from 1987 to 1993. In 1994 Pyles opened Star Canyon. The James Beard Foundation called it one of the top five new restaurants in America, and it was well reviewed in Bon Apetit, Esquire Magazine, Town and Country, Playboy and other publications. The September 1998 issue of Food and Wine Magazine listed Star Canyon as the "quintessential Dallas restaurant."

In 1997, Pyles opened AquaKnox, a global seafood restaurant. It too was named a best new restaurant by Food and Wine. In 1998, Pyles sold Star Canyon and AquaKnox to Carlson Restaurants WorldWide and during the next two years opened new versions of Star Canyon: in Las Vegas, Nevada, at The Venetian, and at the Stephen F. Austin Hotel in Austin, Texas. Back in Dallas he opened FishBowl, an Asian-themed restaurant, and a casual Mexican restaurant called Taqueria Cañonita, which was later replicated in several cities around the U.S.A. He has appeared around the world as a guest celebrity chef and was one of five chefs worldwide invited to prepare dinner for Jimmy Carter’s 70th birthday.  In addition to his  first cookbook, The New Texas Cuisine, Pyles has also co-authored Tamales, and written New Tastes from Texas, and Southwestern Vegetarian. He further worked full-time on the PBS TV show New Tastes from Texas. Pyles was also a cuisine consultant for a number of hotel and resort companies as well as for American Airlines.

Change & New Discoveries
In 2001 Pyles took a five year “siesta” from the restaurant world; he used the time to travel, educate, teach, and write. During this hiatus, he spent significant time in Latin America, the Eastern Mediterranean including the Levant, Spain and India.  These places would all provide cultural influences for his new restaurant ventures. In 2006, Pyles opened in Dallas a new restaurant named after himself.  The "Stephan Pyles" Restaurant is located in the Dallas Arts District and serves an ever newer and more cutting-edge genre of cuisine, "New Millenium Southwestern Cuisine."  This is a global tapestry of tastes, flavors, aromas and textures from Texas, South America, Spain, the Middle East and the Mediterranean.

On November 22, 2009, a second new Dallas Arts District restaurant by Chef Pyles was opened, "Samar by Stephan Pyles". 
The word "Samar" is a concept designed on combining three cultures, Spain, Eastern Mediterranean and India.

Philanthropy, consulting, and scholarship fund
Stephan Pyles is a founding board member of Share Our Strength, America’s largest hunger relief organization. In 1998, Share Our Strength presented Pyles the Humanitarian of the Year Award for his outstanding patronage. Pyles founded Dallas’ Taste of the Nation event for the organization in 1988, raising over $1,500,000 for local ministries and food pantries. He also serves as a life board member of The North Texas Food Bank (NTFB), an organization which “seeks to eliminate hunger by distributing food and grocery products through a network of nonprofits while providing education and increasing community awareness”. Since its inception in 1982, NTFB has procured and locally distributed more than 293 million pounds of food. In 1986, Pyles co-founded NTFB's perishable food program The Hunger Link, which connects Dallas restaurants and hotels with shelters and meal programs.  In addition to running two top-scale and demanding restaurants and his charity work, Pyles serves as a cuisine consultant to Gaylord Texan Resort & Convention Center in Grapevine, Texas, where he developed the restaurant's menu and continues to provide culinary direction.  He also has returned to work as a cuisine consultant for American Airlines and is also a chief chef consultant for Dallas-based Art Institutes International.

Since 2000, the Food and Wine Foundation of Texas has awarded a $15,000 scholarship to a worthy Texas-based culinary student.  The award is given to the winner of a cook-off held in a number of cities around the state.  This scholarship is called "The Stephan Pyles Scholarship Fund."

Cookbooks 
The New Texas Cuisine
Tamales
New Tastes from Texas
Southwestern Vegetarian

See also 
 Share Our Strength

References 

American television chefs
American male chefs
Living people
James Beard Foundation Award winners
American cookbook writers
1952 births
Date of birth missing (living people)